KRVN-FM (93.1 FM, "River 93.1") is a Country formatted radio station licensed to Lexington, Nebraska, United States. The station serves the Grand Island-Kearney area broadcasting from an 890-foot tower in Lexington, Nebraska.  The station was established in November 1962 by the Nebraska Rural Radio Association, the farmer-rancher cooperative that opened KRVN, an AM agricultural news station, in 1951, and since acquired a network of stations across Nebraska.

References

External links

About KRVN – Includes a timeline of developments of the Nebraska Rural Radio Association's network

RVN-FM
Radio stations established in 1962
Country radio stations in the United States